The 2015 NAIA Football National Championship was a four-round, sixteen team tournament played between November 21 and December 19 of 2015.  The tournament concluded on December 19 with a single game played as the 60th Annual NAIA Football National Championship Presented by Waste Pro.  Waste Pro became the newest title game sponsor in an announcement made October 31, 1015. The game matched #7 Southern Oregon (11–2) against #6 Marian (11–2) in a rematch between the two teams that met in the 2014 championship game.  Marian was making its third appearance in the last four years of the championship event.  In a reversal of last year's outcome, Marian prevailed 31-14 to win their second national title in the past four years.

The championship game was played at Municipal Stadium in Daytona Beach, Florida.  A total of sixteen teams were selected to participate in the single-elimination tournament from across the country.  The field included ten conference champions who received automatic bids.  The field was filled with at-large selections that were awarded to the highest ranked teams that were not conference champions.  Seeding was based on the final edition of the 2015 NAIA Coaches' Poll, with certain minor modifications given based on geographic considerations.

Quarterfinal pairings were announced by the NAIA on November 22, a day after the first round results were known.

Semifinal pairings were finalized by the NAIA on November 28, after the quarterfinal results were known.

This was the 2nd time the championship game was played at this venue after the prior six games were played at Barron Stadium in Rome, Georgia.

Tournament bracket

 * denotes OT

References

NAIA Football National Championship
Southern Oregon Raiders football
Marian Knights football
Events in Daytona Beach, Florida
NAIA Football National Championship
NAIA Football National Championship